Svetly Klyuch is a rural locality (a selo) in Krasnopolyanskoye Rural Settlement, Nikolsky District, Vologda Oblast, Russia. The population was 88 as of 2010. There are 3 streets.

Geography 
The distance to Nikolsk is 5 km.

References 

Rural localities in Nikolsky District, Vologda Oblast